The University of Michigan Institute for Social Research (ISR) is one of the largest academic social research and survey organization in the world, established in 1949. ISR includes more than 250 scientists from many academic disciplines – including political science, psychology, sociology, economics, demography, history, anthropology, and statistics. It has been said to be "the premier center for survey research methodology in the world."

History 
In 1946, the sociologist and economist Rensis Likert and six colleagues from his wartime work at the Bureau of Agricultural Economics, including Angus Campbell, Leslie Kish, and George Katona, formed the Survey Research Center (SRC) at the University of Michigan in order to apply the social survey techniques they had developed to broader issues facing post-war America. That year, using techniques developed by Katona, the center began conducting surveys to compute the Consumer Sentiment Index that is one of the eleven components the Department of Commerce includes in its Index of Leading Environmental Indicators.

The center gained visibility in its field due to a survey conducted in October 1948, when Campbell and Robert L. Kahn added two questions about political leanings to a survey they were conducting for the State Department about foreign policy. Their results, compiled just before the presidential election in November, showed a large number of undecided voters and a small lead for Harry Truman over Thomas Dewey, at odds with most other polls that predicted a landslide for Dewey. When Truman ended up winning the election, the subsequent examination of polling techniques led to the probability sampling utilized by the SRC becoming dominant in the field over the quota sampling that had been favored by other polling outfits. This survey was the first of what became the American National Election Studies (or NES).

Psychologist Kurt Lewin had founded the Research Center for Group Dynamics at MIT in 1945, and after his death in 1947 the center's ensuing funding problems prompted its remaining members to find it a new home. The presence of the SRC and the university's support for social sciences led them to move to the University of Michigan in 1948 under a new director, Dorwin Cartwright. The two groups united to form the Institute for Social Research on February 1, 1949.

In 1962, Warren Miller, a political scientist, created the Inter-university Consortium for Political Research (now known as ICPSR) to help fund the maintenance and dissemination of the large data sets that the election studies and others were generating. Making such data sets available to all interested researchers was considered revolutionary at a time when the norm was for researchers to closely guard their data.

The SRC's Political Behavior Program, which had taken over direction of the election studies, became the Center for Political Studies in 1970. The Population Studies Center moved from the university's College of Literature, Science, and the Arts in 1998, bringing the total number of centers to five.

In November of 2003, the band Tally Hall filmed part of the music video here for their song Banana Man, from their album Complete Demos. It was made for a class project at the University of Michigan.

Organization 
The institute is an independent unit of the university, headed by a director who reports directly to the university's provost and executive vice president for academic affairs. It comprises five separate but interdependent centers:
 Center for Political Studies (CPS): An interdisciplinary and collaborative social science research unit of international scope, this center analyzes individual political behavior and the role of institutions in contemporary society.
 Inter-university Consortium for Political and Social Research (ICPSR): The world's largest digital social science data archive, this unit has nearly 700 member organizations from around the globe.
 Population Studies Center: One of the oldest population centers in the United States, the PSC works on domestic and international demographic and population research.
 Research Center for Group Dynamics: The RCGD's research programs range from achievement, aggression, and culture and cognition to evolution and human adaptation.
 Survey Research Center: The SRC does interdisciplinary social science research involving the collection and analysis of data from scientific sample surveys.

References

External links
 University of Michigan Institute for Social Research
 Center for Political Studies
 Inter-university Consortium for Political and Social Research
 Population Studies Center
 Research Center for Group Dynamics
 Survey Research Center
 Banana Man Music Video

University of Michigan schools, colleges, and departments
Social science institutes
1949 establishments in Michigan
Research institutes established in 1949
University of Michigan campus